Samla riwo is a species of sea slug, an aeolid nudibranch, a marine heterobranch mollusc in the family Samlidae.

Distribution
This species was described from Madang, Papua New Guinea. It is reported from sites throughout the Indo-West Pacific.

Description
Samla riwo typically reaches a length of 20 mm when fully mature. It has a translucent white body covered with a lacy, white network of pigment. The oral tentacles are expanded at the tips into spear-like points or paddles. The bottom 2/3 of each of the cerata is translucent with pale peach-coloured digestive gland. Above this region there is a purple band around the ceras, followed by a white tip. The rhinophores have a bare, cylindrical basal region followed by a perfoliate club with 16-22 densely packed lamellae.

References

External links
 

Samlidae
Gastropods described in 1991